Akat Amnuai is a district (amphoe) of Sakon Nakhon province, northeast Thailand.

History
The minor district (king amphoe) Akat Amnuai was created on 15 May 1963, when the four tambons Akat, Wa Yai, Phon Phaeng, and Phon Ngam were split off from Wanon Niwat district. On 27 July 1965 it was upgraded to a full district.

Geography
Neighboring districts are (from the north clockwise) Seka of Bueng Kan province, Na Thom, Si Songkhram, and Na Wa of Nakhon Phanom province, and Phanna Nikhom, Wanon Niwat, and Kham Ta Kla of Sakon Nakhon Province.

Administration
The district is divided into eight sub-districts (tambons), which are further subdivided into 92 villages (mubans). The township (thesaban tambon) Akat Amnuai covers parts of tambon Akat. There are a further eight tambon administrative organizations.

References

External links
amphoe.com

Akat Amnuai